I Can Feel You Creep Into My Private Life is the fourth full-length release by Merrill Garbus' project Tune-Yards. It was released on 4AD Records on January 19, 2018. Nate Brenner is also listed as a collaborator. The album was mixed by Mikaelin BlueSpruce. The majority of the album was recorded at Tiny Telephone Oakland and mastered in Harlem, New York, by Dave Kutch.

Musical style 
I Can Feel You Creep Into My Private Life has more electronic influences than Garbus's previous work. It is inspired by Haitian and Kenyan music, as well her life as a DJ in California. The album's themes include feminism, race intolerance, and freedom. Identity politics are the main focus of the album; Garbus said the work was inspired by a desire to "resonate with what’s going on in the world."

Reception 

Upon release, the album was met positively. It holds a current score of 78/100 on review aggregator Metacritic, indicating "generally favorable reviews."

Track listing

Charts

References 

2018 albums
4AD albums
Tune-Yards albums